Frauenbefreiungsbewegung (FBB), was a women's organization in Switzerland, founded in 1969.

After the failed referendum of 1959, when the suggestion to introduce women's suffrage failed, the anti suffrage Bund der Schweizerinnen gegen das Frauenstimmrecht was founded to oppose the work of the pro-suffrage Schweizerischer Verband für Frauenstimmrecht, and many modern feminists felt that the traditional women's movement was too moderate. The FBB was a radical organization founded in Zürich with members from both the ongoing student movement and the traditional Swiss feminist movement. The FBB played an important role in the successful fight for women's suffrage in Switzerland in 1971.

References 

Women's suffrage in Switzerland
Feminist organisations in Switzerland
1969 establishments in Switzerland
Political organisations based in Switzerland
Organizations established in 1969
Voter rights and suffrage organizations
1969 in women's history